Skytte is a surname. Notable people with the surname include:

 Bengt Skytte (1614–1683), Swedish courtier and diplomat
 Christina Anna Skytte (1643–1677), Swedish noblewoman
 Gustav Skytte (1637–1663), Swedish nobleman and pirate
 Johan Skytte (1577–1645), Swedish politician
 Karl Skytte (1908–1986), Danish politician
 Maria Skytte (died 1703), Swedish noblewoman
 Vendela Skytte (1608–1629), Swedish noblewoman, writer, and poet